Marc Rotenberg is president and founder of the Center for AI and Digital Policy, an independent non-profit organization, incorporated in Washington, D.C. Rotenberg is the editor of The AI Policy Sourcebook, a member of the OECD Expert Group on AI, and helped draft the Universal Guidelines for AI.  He teaches the GDPR and privacy law at Georgetown Law and is coauthor of Privacy Law and Society (West Academic 2016) and The Privacy Law Sourcebook (2020). Rotenberg is a founding board member and former chair of the Public Interest Registry, which manages the .ORG domain.

Center for AI and Digital Policy 
The Center for AI and Digital Policy (CAIDP) aims to promote a better society, more fair, more just — "a world where technology promotes broad social inclusion based on fundamental rights, democratic institutions, and the rule of law." CAIDP began as a project of the Michael Dukakis Institute. CAIDP has provided AI policy advice to many organizations and institutions, including the African Commission on Human and Peoples' Rights, the Council of Europe Committee on AI, the Club de Madrid, the European Commission and the European Parliament, the G7 and the G20, the Global Partnership on AI, the Government of Colombia, the National Security Commission on AI (US), the National AI Advisory Committee (US), the Organization of American States, and others.

In 2020, CAIDP published "Artificial Intelligence and Democratic Values," a comprehensive review of AI policies and practices in 30 nations. CAIDP publishes weekly the CAIDP Update, and hosts monthly Conversations with AI policy experts, authors, and artists. Speakers have included Shalini Kantayya (the director of Coded Bias), Cade Metz (the author of Genius Makers), and Gregor Strojin (the President of the CAHAI). In 2021, CAIDP launched the first AI policy clinic and issued certificates to those who completed a course in AI policy analysis.

EPIC 
Marc Rotenberg was president and executive director of the Electronic Privacy Information Center (EPIC), an independent, public interest research center in Washington, D.C., which he co-founded in 1994. EPIC was involved with a wide range of civil liberties, consumer protection, and human rights issues. EPIC pursued several successful consumer privacy complaints with the US Federal Trade Commission, concerning Uber (collection of location data), Snapchat (faulty privacy technology), WhatsApp (revised privacy policy after acquisition by Facebook), Facebook (changes in user privacy settings), Google (roll-out of Google Buzz), Microsoft (Hailstorm log-in), and Choicepoint (sale of personal information to identity thieves). EPIC prevailed in significant Freedom of Information Act cases against the CIA, the DHS, the Dept. of Education, the FBI, the NSA, the ODNI, and the TSA. EPIC filed many "friend of the court" briefs on law and technology, including Riley v. California (U.S. 2014)(concerning cell phone privacy), and litigated important privacy cases, including EPIC v. DHS (D.C. Cir. 2011), which led to the removal of the x-ray body scanners in US airports, and EPIC v. NSA (D.C. Cir. 2014), which led to the release of the NSA's formerly secret cybersecurity authority. EPIC also challenged the NSA's domestic surveillance program in a petition to the US Supreme Court, In re EPIC (U.S. 2013), after the release of the "Verizon Order" in June 2013. One of EPIC's cases concerned the obligation of the Federal Aviation Administration to establish privacy regulations prior to the deployment of commercial drones in the United States. EPIC v. FAA (D.C. Cir. 2016).

In 2017, EPIC launched a project on Democracy and Cybersecurity to determine the extent of Russian interference with the 2016 Presidential election and to prevent future attacks on democratic institutions. EPIC pursued four Freedom of Information Act lawsuits. In EPIC v. ODNI, EPIC sought the public release of the report of the Intelligence Community on the Russian interference with the 2016 election. In EPIC v. FBI, EPIC sought records concerning the Bureau's response to an attack by a foreign government on the political institutions of the United States. In EPIC v. IRS, EPIC sought the release of Donald Trump's tax returns.  In EPIC v. DHS, EPIC helped determine the role of DHS in election integrity. At the 2017 EPIC Champion of Freedom Awards Dinner in Washington, DC, EPIC honored former world chess champion, author, and human rights advocate Garry Kasparov  In EPIC v. Presidential Advisory Commission on Election Integrity EPIC successfully blocked the "Kobach Commission" from obtaining state voter data. EPIC charged that the Commission had failed to undertake a privacy impact assessment, required by law. Exactly six months after EPIC filed suit, the Commission was disbanded. Under court order resulting from EPIC's case, the White House subsequently deleted the voter data that was wrongfully obtained.

Marc Rotenberg was forced out of his position at EPIC after a terminated employee and a board member who was upset that Rotenberg would not endorse her book conspired to place a false and defamatory story. (The article was described by an EPIC staff member as "vindictive.") In fact, Rotenberg went to a mostly empty building to pay bills, update organizational records, arrange for the early payment of staff salaries, and protect the interests of board members in case he was unable to return to work. Rotenberg subsequently sued EPIC in DC Superior Court for unlawful termination and received a settlement.  Rotenberg then filed a 76-page complaint in Federal District Court against The Protocol and POLITICO, the parent company. In support of his claims, he cited an opinion of future Supreme Court Justice Kentanji Brown Jackson. In October 2021, POLITICO was sold to Axel Springer. In November 2022, the Protocol was shut down. In March 2023, a federal court dismissed the case.

Advisory panels 
Marc Rotenberg has served on many national and international advisory panels, including the expert panels on Cryptography Policy and Computer Security for the OECD, the Legal Experts on Cyberspace Law for UNESCO, and the Countering Spam program of the ITU. He is a former chair of the ABA Committee on Privacy and Information Protection. He is a member of the International Working Group on Data Protection in Telecommunications, the FREE Group (European Area of Freedom Security & Justice), and other organizations dedicated to the protection of fundamental rights.

In 2021, Rotenberg was named to the Reference Panel of the Global Privacy Assembly (the global network of privacy officials and experts) and the CAHAI (the AI expert panel of the Council of Europe). In May, he was shortlisted (#2) for the post of UN Special Rapporteur for the Right to Privacy. In June, he received the ACM Policy Award for “long-standing high impact leadership on privacy and technology policy.” In December, Rotenberg was named as an expert for the Global Partnership on AI for a three-year term and also a Fulbright Specialist for a four-year term.

Support for Civil Society 
Marc Rotenberg has helped establish several organizations that promote public understanding of computer technology and encourage civil society participation in decisions concerning the future of the Internet. These include the Public Interest Computer Association (1983), Computer Professionals for Social Responsibility (1985), the conference on Computers, Freedom, and Privacy (1991), the Public Voice Coalition (1996), the Public Interest Registry (2003), the Civil Society Information Society Advisory Council to the OECD (CSISAC) (2009), and the EPIC Public Voice Fund (2018).

Publications 
Marc Rotenberg is co-editor of Privacy in the Modern Age: The Search for Solutions (The New Press 2015), a collection of articles on the future of privacy. Other books include The Privacy Law Sourcebook: United States Law, International Law, and Recent Developments (EPIC 2020),  Privacy and Human Rights: An International Survey of Privacy Laws and Developments (EPIC 2006), Litigation Under the Federal Open Government Laws (EPIC 2010), Information Privacy Law (Aspen Publishing 2007) and "Privacy and Technology: The New Frontier" (MIT Press 1999). Rotenberg has also published articles and commentaries in legal, technical, and popular journals, including the ACS Supreme Court Review, Communications of the ACM, Computers & Society, CNN, Costco Connect, the Duke Law Journal, the Economist, the European Data Protection Review, The Financial Times, Fortune, the Indiana Law Review, the Harvard Business Review, the Harvard Journal of Law and Public Policy, the Harvard International Review, Issues in Science and Technology, the Japan Economic Forum, the Minnesota Law Review, Newsweek, Scientific American, the Stanford Technology Law Review, Techonomy, and USA Today, among others.

Education and honors 
Rotenberg is a graduate of Harvard College and Stanford Law School, and received an LL.M. in international and comparative law from Georgetown Law. At  Harvard, he was a founding editor of the Harvard International Review and a head teaching fellow in computer science.  At Stanford he was an articles editor of the Stanford Law Review and president of the Stanford Public Interest Law Foundation. He was also the research assistant to A. Leon Higginbotham Jr., when the Judge and former FTC Commissioner (the first African American appointed as a commissioner on any regulatory commission) was a visiting professor at Stanford Law School. He served as counsel to Senator Patrick J. Leahy on the Senate Judiciary Committee after graduation from law school. He is a Life Fellow of the American Bar Foundation, a Life Member of the Council on Foreign Relations, a Sustaining Member of the European Law Institute, and the recipient of several awards, including the Norbert Wiener Award for Social and Professional Responsibility, the American Lawyer Top Lawyers Under 45, and the Vicennial Medal (2012) for distinguished service from Georgetown University. He was included in the "Lawdragon 500", a listing of the leading lawyers in America, and received the ABA Cyberspace Law Excellence Award, the World Technology Award for Law, and the Berkeley Center for Law and Technology Award for Outstanding Contribution to Law and Technology.

Personal 
Marc Rotenberg grew up in Boston, Massachusetts. His brother Jonathan Rotenberg founded the Boston Computer Society at age 13. Marc is married to Anna Markopoulos Rotenberg, a former economist and now ESL teacher in the District of Columbia and Alexandria Public Schools. A tournament chess player, Rotenberg is a three-time Washington, D.C., chess Champion (2007, 2008, 2010) and works to promote chess in the DC public schools in cooperation with the US Chess Center and ChessGirlsDC. Rotenberg is also a licensed US Coast Guard captain.

References

External links
 Georgetown Law biography for Marc Rotenberg

Privacy activists
American lawyers
Living people
1960 births
Harvard College alumni
Stanford Law School alumni
Georgetown University Law Center faculty
Georgetown University Law Center alumni